This is the first edition of the event.

Bjorn Fratangelo won it, beating Chung Hyeon in the final by a score of 4–6, 6–2, 7–5.

Seeds

Draw

Finals

Top half

Bottom half

References
 Main Draw
 Qualifying Draw

Launceston Tennis International - Singles
2015 Singles
2015 in Australian tennis